CEE 7  is a standard  for alternating-current plugs and sockets.  First published in 1951 by the former  International Commission on the Rules for the Approval of Electrical Equipment (IECEE), it unified standards produced by several continental European countries. The 2nd edition was published in 1963 and last updated in March 1983.  It remains available from the IEC, but they state that "this standard shall not be used alone, it is to be used in addition to IEC 60884-1".

CEE 7 standards
The International Commission on the Rules for the Approval of Electrical Equipment (IECEE) was a standards body which published Specification for plugs and socket-outlets for domestic and similar purposes as CEE Publication 7, known simply as CEE 7. It was originally published in 1951, the 2nd edition was published in May 1963 and was last updated by Modification 4 in March 1983. CEE 7 consists of general specifications, plus a number of standard sheets for specific connectors.

A number of standards based on two round pins with centres spaced at 19 mm are in use in continental Europe and elsewhere, most of which are listed in IEC/TR 60083 "Plugs and socket-outlets for domestic and similar general use standardized in member countries of IEC". There is no European Union regulation of domestic mains plugs and sockets, and the Low Voltage Directive specifically excludes domestic plugs and sockets. EU countries each have their own regulations and national standards; for example, some require child-resistant shutters, while others do not. CE marking is neither applicable nor permitted on plugs and sockets.

CEE 7/1 unearthed socket and CEE 7/2 unearthed plug

CEE 7/1 unearthed sockets are designed to accept CEE 7/2 round plugs without notches in the body and having  pins.

Because they have no earth connections they have been or are being phased out in most countries. The regulations of countries using the CEE 7/3 and CEE 7/5 socket standards vary in whether CEE 7/1 sockets are still permitted in environments where the need for earthing is less critical. Sweden, for example, prohibited them from new installations in 1994. In Germany unearthed sockets are rare, whereas in the Netherlands and Sweden it is still common to find them in "dry areas" such as in bedrooms or living rooms. Some countries prohibit use of unearthed and earthed sockets in the same room, in the "insulated room" concept, so that people cannot touch an earthed object and one that has become live, at the same time.

The depth of the sockets varies between countries and age. Older sockets are so shallow that it is possible to touch the pins of a plug when the plug is inserted only deep enough to get electrical power on the pins, while newer sockets are deep enough to protect from this kind of accident. CEE 7/1 sockets accept CEE 7/4, CEE 7/6 and CEE 7/7 plugs without providing an earth connection. The earthed CEE 7/3 and CEE 7/5 sockets were specifically designed not to allow insertion of CEE 7/2 unearthed round plugs fitted to older appliances which had to be earthed via other means.

CEE 7/3 socket and CEE 7/4 plug (German "Schuko"; Type F)

The CEE 7/3 socket and CEE 7/4 plug are commonly called Schuko. The Schuko connection system is symmetrical and unpolarised in its design, allowing line and neutral to be reversed. The socket also accepts Europlugs and CEE 7/17 plugs. It is rated at 16 A. The current German standards are DIN 49441:1972-06 "Two-pole plugs with earthing-contact 10 A 250 V≅ and 10 A 250 V–, 16 A 250 V∼" (which also includes CEE 7/7 plug) and DIN 49440-1:2006-01 "Two-pole socket-outlets with earthing contact, 16 A 250 V a.c."

In addition to Germany, it is used in Albania, Austria, Belarus, Bosnia and Herzegovina, Bulgaria, Chile, Croatia, Denmark, Estonia, Finland, Georgia, Greece, Hungary, Iceland, Indonesia, Iran, Italy (standard CEI 23-50), Kazakhstan, Latvia, Lithuania, Luxembourg, North Macedonia, Moldova, the Netherlands, Norway, Pakistan, Peru, Portugal, Romania, Russia, Serbia, Slovenia, South Korea, Spain, Sweden, Turkey, Ukraine, and Uruguay.

It was widely used in Ireland until 1964, a legacy of Ireland's early electricity grid which was largely built based on design work on the Shannon hydroelectric scheme by Siemens-Schuckert. The British BS1363 (localised as Irish Standard I.S.401) was adopted as the new standard plug to ease import of electrical appliances from the UK. CEE 7/1 and CEE 7/4 are still occasionally found in less used areas of some older homes, particularly in outbuildings or hot presses.

Schuko is an abbreviation for the German word Schutzkontakt, which means "Protective contact" - in this case "protective" refers to the earth.

Some countries, including South Korea, Portugal, Finland, Denmark, Norway and Sweden, require child-proof socket shutters; the German DIN 49440-1:2006-01 standard does not have this requirement.

CEE 7/5 socket and CEE 7/6 plug (French; Type E)

This standard is also used in Belgium, Denmark, Poland, Czechia, Slovakia and some other countries.

Although the plug is polarised, CEE 7 does not define the placement of the line and neutral and there is no universally-observed standard. However, the Czech and Slovak standards defined that the earth pin should be at the top, if no special reason against, and the line wire had to be on the left side when facing the socket; those requirements are abandoned now. The French convention changed circa 2002 from nothing particular, to, if the earth pin was at the top then the line hole in the socket would be on the right looking at the socket. However, the socket may not necessarily be installed with the earth pin at the top. Packaging in France of sockets is normally marked with correct connection of the cables. Polarised pre-fitted plugs on appliances are therefore connected with the brown line wire to the right pin and the blue neutral wire to the left, the earth being connected to the contact at the "top" of the plug.

CEE 7/2 and 7/4 plugs are not compatible with the CEE 7/5 socket because of the round earthing pin permanently mounted in the socket.

CEE 7/7 plug (compatible with E and F) 

 To bridge the differences between German and French standards, the CEE 7/7 plug was developed. It is polarised to prevent the line and neutral connections from being reversed  when used with a French CEE 7/5 socket, but allows polarity reversal when inserted into a German CEE 7/3 socket. The plug is rated at 16 A.

It has earthing clips on both sides to connect with the CEE 7/3 socket and a female contact to accept the earthing pin of the CEE 7/5 socket. Currently, appliances in many countries are sold with non-rewireable CEE 7/7 plugs attached, enabling use in all countries whose socket standards are based on either CEE 7/3 or CEE 7/5.

This plug can be inserted into a Danish Type K socket, but earthing is not enabled.

CEE 7/16 plugs 
The CEE 7/16 standard sheet appears in Supplement 2 (June 1962) to the 1951 edition of CEE 7. The CEE 7/16 unearthed plug is used for low power Class II applications, it has two round 4 by 19 mm (0.157 by 0.748 in) pins, rated at 2.5 A. There are two variants.

CEE 7/16 Alternative I
Alternative I is a round plug with cutouts to make it compatible with CEE 7/3 and CEE 7/5 sockets. (The similar-appearing CEE 7/17 has larger pins and a higher current rating.)  This alternative is seldom used.

CEE 7/16 Alternative II "Europlug" (Type C)

Alternative II, popularly known as the Europlug, is a flat plug defined by Cenelec standard EN 50075 and national equivalents. The Europlug is not rewirable and must be supplied with a flexible cord. It can be inserted in either direction, so line and neutral are connected arbitrarily.

There is no socket defined by EN 50075; nor a socket specified in CEE 7 to accept only the Europlug. Instead, the Europlug was designed to be compatible with a range of sockets in common use in Europe. These sockets, including the CEE 7/1, CEE 7/3 (German/"Schuko"), CEE 7/5 (French), and most Israeli, Swiss, Danish and Italian sockets, were designed to accept pins of various diameters, mainly 4.8 mm but also 4.0 mm and 4.5 mm, and are usually fed by final circuits with either 10 A or 16 A overcurrent protection devices. To improve contact with socket parts the Europlug has slightly flexible pins which converge toward their free ends.

UK  shaver sockets designed to accept BS 4573 shaver plugs also accept Europlugs for applications requiring less than 200 mA. Other than such personal hygiene applications, UK consumer protection legislation does not permit Europlugs.

The Europlug is also used in the Middle East, Africa, South America, and Asia .

CEE 7/17 unearthed plug

This is a round plug which conforms to a shape compatible with CEE 7/1, CEE 7/3, and CEE 7/5 sockets. It may be rated at either 10 A or 16 A, and may be used for unearthed Class II appliances (and in South Korea for all domestic non-earthed appliances). It is also defined as the Class II plug in Italian standard CEI 23-50. It can be inserted into Israeli SI 32 with some difficulty. The Soviet GOST 7396 standard includes both the CEE 7/17 and the CEE 7/16 variant II plug.

See also
 Mains electricity by country
 AC power plugs and sockets: British and related types
 NEMA connector

References

Electrical standards